Space engine may mean:

 Rocket engine, which can be used to propel spacecraft
 SpaceEngine, a 3D astronomy program and game engine